1997 Nagoya Grampus Eight season

Competitions

Domestic results

J.League

Emperor's Cup

J.League Cup

Sanwa Bank Cup

Player statistics

 † player(s) joined the team after the opening of this season.

Transfers

In:

Out:

Transfers during the season

In
Masaharu Suzuki (from Yokohama Marinos)
Valdo Cândido Filho (from Lisboa e Benfica on July)

Out
Masaru Hirayama (to Kawasaki Frontale)
Kazumasa Kawano (loan to Yokohama Marinos)

Awards
none

References
J.LEAGUE OFFICIAL GUIDE 1997, 1997 
J.LEAGUE OFFICIAL GUIDE 1998, 1996 
J.LEAGUE YEARBOOK 1999, 1999

Other pages
 J. League official site
 Nagoya Grampus official site

Nagoya Grampus Eight
Nagoya Grampus seasons